Rudranil Ghosh is an Indian actor who works primarily in Bengali films.

Education
Rudranil Ghosh completed his early education at Santragachi Kedarnath Institution, Howrah under West Bengal State Board. He graduated from the Narasinha Dutt College, which is affiliated with the University of Calcutta, in 1995.

Political career 
He is a member of Bharatiya Janata Party and contested Bhabanipur (Vidhan Sabha constituency) in the 2021 West Bengal Legislative Assembly election against AITC leader Sovandeb Chatterjee and lost by a margin of 28,719 votes.

Filmography

Awards
 2007: BFJA - Best Supporting Actor Award for both Kantatar and Refugee

References

External links

|-
! colspan="3" style="background: #DAA520;" | BFJA Awards
|-
 

|-

Indian male film actors
Living people
Male actors from Kolkata
People from Howrah
Bengali male actors
Bengali Hindus
Male actors in Bengali cinema
Bengal Film Journalists' Association Award winners
1973 births
University of Calcutta alumni
21st-century Indian male actors
Bigg Boss Bangla contestants
Bharatiya Janata Party politicians from West Bengal